The World Para Powerlifting Championships, known before 30 November 2016 as the IPC Powerlifting World Championships, is an event organized by the International Paralympic Committee (IPC). Competitors with a physical disability compete, and in a few events athletes with an intellectual disability compete. First held in 1994, the competition was held every four years. Since 2017, it is held every two years. The competitions are also part of the qualification process to compete at the Summer Paralympics.

The first IPC Powerlifting World Championships were held in Uppsala, Sweden in 1994. On 30 November 2016, the IPC, which serves as the international federation for 10 disability sports, including powerlifting, adopted the "World Para" brand for all 10 sports. The world championship events in all of these sports were immediately rebranded as "World Para" championships.

Editions

References

 
Recurring sporting events established in 1994